Dávid Ubornyák (born 8 September 1998) is a Hungarian handball player for Tatabánya KC and the Hungarian national team.

He represented Hungary at the 2020 European Men's Handball Championship.

References

External links

Hungarian male handball players
Living people
1998 births
People from Szabadszállás
Veszprém KC players
Sportspeople from Bács-Kiskun County